Como Lake is a glacial lake in Lombardy, Italy.

Como Lake may also refer to:

Places
Canada
 Como Lake (British Columbia), a small lake
 Como Lake Middle School, in Coquitlam, British Columbia

United States
 Como Lake (Minnesota), a lake
 Como Lake Park, a county park near Buffalo, New York

See also
 Lake Como (disambiguation)